The Rural Municipality of South Qu'Appelle No. 157 is a rural municipality (RM) in the Canadian province of Saskatchewan within Census Division No. 6 and  Division No. 1. It is located in the southeast portion of the province.

History 
The RM of South Qu'Appelle No. 157 incorporated as a rural municipality on August 6, 1884.

Geography 
The burrowing owl (athene cunicularia), an endangered animal, makes its home in this area.

Communities and localities 
The following urban municipalities are surrounded by the RM.

Towns
Qu'Appelle
Villages
McLean

The following unincorporated communities are within the RM.

Organized hamlets
Edgeley
St. Joseph's

Localities
Avonhurst

Demographics 

Government 
The RM of South Qu'Appelle No. 157 is governed by an elected municipal council and an appointed administrator that meets on the second Wednesday of every month. The reeve of the RM is Jeannie DesRochers while its administrator is Heidi Berlin. The RM's office is located in Qu'Appelle.

References 

 
South Qu'Appelle
Division No. 6, Saskatchewan